Okaro White (born August 13, 1992) is an American professional basketball player for Lokomotiv Kuban of the VTB United League. He played college basketball for Florida State.

Early life
White was born in Brooklyn, New York, on August 13, 1992, and has an older brother and sister. His mother, Charmaine White, ran track for the Jamaica national team. As a preteen, his family moved to Clearwater, Florida, to be close to his grandmother.

In eighth grade, he experienced a growth spurt, growing five-and-a-half inches in the summer.

White was named Pinellas County's Basketball Player of the Year as a senior at Clearwater High School.

College career
White chose to play college basketball at Florida State after receiving scholarship offers from Florida, Georgia Tech, Indiana, Clemson, and Miami (Fl.). At Florida State, he started on two NCAA Tournament teams. He averaged 13.6 points and 6.8 rebounds per game in his senior season with Florida State, both career highs. In addition, White connected on 37.5 percent of his 3-point shots. He defended both guards and forwards and alternated between the small and power forward positions. White was one of 64 seniors selected to play in the Portsmouth Invitational Tournament.

Professional career

Virtus Bologna (2014–2015)
After going undrafted in the 2014 NBA draft, White joined the Memphis Grizzlies for the 2014 NBA Summer League. In five games, he averaged 8.2 points and 2.6 rebounds per game. On July 31, 2014, he signed with Virtus Bologna of Italy for the 2014–15 season. In 33 games for the club, he averaged 12.1 points, 6.8 rebounds, 1.1 assists and 1.0 blocks per game in the top-tier Italian League.

Aris Thessaloniki (2015–2016)
In July 2015, White joined the Memphis Grizzlies for the Orlando Summer League and the Dallas Mavericks for the Las Vegas Summer League. On August 7, 2015, he signed a one-year deal with Aris Thessaloniki of the Greek Basket League and the EuroCup. In 26 Greek League regular season games, he averaged 13.5 points, 7.0 rebounds, 1.9 assists, 1.7 steals, and 0.4 blocks per game. He led the Greek League's regular season phase with a total accumulated Performance Index Rating (PIR) of 474, thus being the league's regular season PIR leader.

In 10 Greek League playoff games, he averaged 14.9 points, 8.1 rebounds, 0.8 assists, 1.3 steals, and 1.1 blocks per game. Over 36 games in 2015–16, he averaged 13.9 points, 7.3 rebounds, 1.6 assists and 1.6 steals per game. He was named to the 2015–16 Greek League Best Five, and he was named the 2015–16 Greek League Most Spectacular Player. In the 2015–16 EuroCup season, he averaged 11.0 points and 6.4 rebounds in 16 games.

Sioux Falls Skyforce (2016–2017)
In June 2016, White joined the Miami Heat for the 2016 NBA Summer League. He went on to sign with the Heat on July 15, 2016, but he was waived on October 22, after appearing in six preseason games. On November 1, 2016, he was acquired by the Sioux Falls Skyforce of the NBA Development League as an affiliate player of the Heat.

Miami Heat (2017–2018)
On January 17, 2017, he returned to the Heat, signing a 10-day contract with the team to help them deal with numerous injuries. Miami had to use an NBA hardship exemption in order to sign him as he made their roster stand at 16, being one player over the allowed limited of 15. He made his NBA debut two days later, recording one rebound in nine minutes off the bench in a 99–95 win over the Dallas Mavericks. He signed a second 10-day contract with the Heat on January 27, and a rest-of-season deal on February 6. On February 16, 2017, he was assigned to the Sioux Falls Skyforce so he could participate in the NBA Development League All-Star game.

On February 8, 2018, the Heat traded White to the Atlanta Hawks in exchange for Luke Babbitt and was later waived.

Cleveland Cavaliers (2018)
On March 18, 2018, the Cleveland Cavaliers signed White to a 10-day contract.

On April 7, 2018, the Cleveland Cavaliers signed White for the remainder of the season and was eligible to play in the playoffs. The Cavaliers made it to the 2018 NBA Finals, but lost in four games to the Golden State Warriors.

On August 5, 2018, White was waived by the Cleveland Cavaliers. On September 24, 2018, White was included in the training camp roster for the San Antonio Spurs but was later waived by the Spurs on October 13.

Washington Wizards (2018)
On November 23, 2018, the Washington Wizards announced that they had signed White, but White was later waived by the Wizards on December 20.

Long Island Nets (2019)
On January 4, 2019, the Long Island Nets announced that they had acquired White.

Unics Kazan (2020–2021)
On August 31, 2020, he signed with UNICS Kazan of the VTB United League. He reached the EuroCup finals with the Russian club, averaging 10.1 points and 5.4 rebounds per game.

Panathinaikos (2021–2022)
On July 14, 2021, White officially signed a two-year (1+1) deal with Panathinaikos of the Greek Basket League and the EuroLeague, returning to Greece under his Kazan coach Dimitris Priftis. In 32 Greek Basket League games, he averaged 11.5 points and 5.3 rebounds, playing around 23 minutes per contest. Additionally, in 29 EuroLeague games, he averaged 8.4 points and 3.7 rebounds, playing around 23 minutes per contest.

Windy City Bulls (2022)
On October 23, 2022, White joined the Windy City Bulls training camp roster.

Career statistics

NBA

|-
| style="text-align:left;"| 
| style="text-align:left;"| Miami
| 35 || 0 || 13.5 || .379 || .353 || .909 || 2.3 || .6 || .3 || .3 || 2.8
|-
| style="text-align:left;"| 
| style="text-align:left;"| Miami
| 6 || 4 || 13.3 || .438 || .364 || .667 || 1.8 || .3 || .2 || .2 || 3.3
|-
| style="text-align:left;"| 
| style="text-align:left;"| Washington
| 3 || 0 || 2.0 || .000 || .000 || - || .7 || .0 || .0 || .0 || 0.0
|- class="sortbottom"
| style="text-align:center;" colspan="2"| Career
| 44 || 4 || 12.7 || .381 || .340 || .880 || 2.2 || .5 || .3 || .3 || 2.7

College

|-
| style="text-align:left;"| 2010–11
| style="text-align:left;"| Florida State
| 34 || 13 || 16.5 || .444 || .265 || .828 || 3.1 || .5 || .7 || .4 || 6.6
|-
| style="text-align:left;"| 2011–12
| style="text-align:left;"| Florida State
| 35 || 12 || 22.6 || .476 || .333 || .752 || 4.4 || .5 || .6 || .4 || 7.7
|-
| style="text-align:left;"| 2012–13
| style="text-align:left;"| Florida State
| 34 || 34 || 28.9 || .511 || .313 || .815 || 5.9 || .8 || 1.0 || 1.1 || 12.4
|-
| style="text-align:left;"| 2013–14
| style="text-align:left;"| Florida State
| 36 || 35 || 30.1 || .514 || .375 || .798 || 6.8 || .9 || .8 || 1.1 || 13.6
|- class="sortbottom"
| style="text-align:center;" colspan="2"| Career
| 139 || 94 || 24.6 || .494 || .327 || .799 || 5.1 || .7 || .7 || .8 || 10.1

References

External links

Okaro White at eurocupbasketball.com
Okaro White at legabasket.it 
Okaro White at baskethotel.com
Okaro White at esake.gr 
Okaro White at seminoles.com

1992 births
Living people
American expatriate basketball people in Greece
American expatriate basketball people in Italy
American expatriate basketball people in Russia
American men's basketball players
Aris B.C. players
Basketball players from Florida
BC UNICS players
Capital City Go-Go players
Clearwater High School alumni
Florida State Seminoles men's basketball players
Long Island Nets players
Miami Heat players
Panathinaikos B.C. players
Power forwards (basketball)
Sioux Falls Skyforce players
Sportspeople from Brooklyn
Basketball players from New York City
Sportspeople from Clearwater, Florida
Undrafted National Basketball Association players
Virtus Bologna players
Washington Wizards players